Gylfi Gylfason (born 22 September 1977) is an Icelandic handball player who competed in the 2004 Summer Olympics.

References

1977 births
Living people
Gylfi Gylfason
Gylfi Gylfason
Handball players at the 2004 Summer Olympics